ESPN NBA 2Night 2002 is a video game in the ESPN NBA 2Night Basketball franchise, developed by Konami and released for PlayStation 2 and Xbox.  It is a sequel to ESPN NBA 2Night, which had been released for Dreamcast in 2000 and PlayStation 2 in 2001.

Teams
 Atlanta Hawks
 Boston Celtics
 Chicago Bulls
 Cleveland Cavaliers
 Golden State Warriors
 Los Angeles Clippers
 Los Angeles Lakers
 Brooklyn Nets
 New York Knicks

Modes
 Exhibition
 Season
 Playoffs
 Franchise

Reception

The game received "mixed" reviews on both platforms according to the review aggregation website Metacritic. In Japan, Famitsu gave it a score of 30 out of 40 on both platforms.

References

External links

2002 video games
ESPN video games
Konami games
National Basketball Association video games
PlayStation 2 games
Xbox games
Video games developed in Japan